This is a list of installations operated by the United States Space Force (USSF), located within the United States and abroad. Locations where the Space Force has a notable presence but do not operate the facility will also be listed, as the service branch develops.

Background 
The location and number of US Space Force installations is in proportion to the size of the prior US Air Force-led US Space Command, the capabilities of available weapon systems, and the strategies contemplated for their employment. As of December 2020, the number of active duty Space Force bases is six, with several more smaller USSF stations, and most of them located within the continental United States.

Locations of current US Space Force installations 

Some installations are still called "Air Force Base", although operated by the US Space Force.
Buckley Space Force Base in Aurora, Colorado
Los Angeles Air Force Base in El Segundo, California
Patrick Space Force Base near Satellite Beach, Florida. (Cape Canaveral Space Force Station is also located in the area, near Kennedy Space Center)
Peterson Space Force Base in Colorado Springs, Colorado
Schriever Space Force Base in Colorado Springs, Colorado
Vandenberg Space Force Base in Lompoc, California

Contiguous United States 
Installations and locations in the contiguous United States. For Alaska and Hawaii see Pacific, East Asia and South East Asia section.

Overseas

US Space Force installation terminology
In the US Air Force, active duty installations are normally named after notable Air Force personnel, whereas Air Force Reserve and Air National Guard installations are named in the same manner or after the community in which they are located. Because the Space Force is a new service branch, it is defaulting to the current Air Force terminology for its rank structure and location names. It may follow the aforementioned guidelines of the Air Force, follow guidelines of the US Navy, or create its own standard. The USSF does not currently operate a reserve or national guard force.

See also
 List of United States Air Force installations
 List of United States Army installations
 List of United States Marine Corps installations
 List of United States Navy installations
 List of United States Coast Guard installations
 List of United States military bases
 Lists of military installations

References

Installations of the United States Space Force
United States Space Force lists